Puteri Indonesia 2016, the 20th Puteri Indonesia pageant, was held on February 19, 2016 at Jakarta Convention Center, Jakarta, Indonesia. Anindya Kusuma Putri, Puteri Indonesia 2015 of Central Java, crowned her successor Kezia Warouw of North Sulawesi at the end of the event. All 39 contestants from 34 provinces competed for the crown. The winner represented Indonesia at the Miss Universe 2016, while the runners-up competed at Miss International 2016,  Miss Supranational 2016, and Miss Grand International 2016. Also Miss International 2015 Edymar Martínez of Venezuela attend at the Grand Final Show. 
It is traditional for Miss Universe to attend on the Final Show of Puteri Indonesia, but Miss Universe 2015 of the Philippines had fashion show scheduled in New York City at the same time, and could not attend. Miss International 2015 replaced her as special guest.

Kezia Warouw was the second woman from North Sulawesi to be selected as the winner of the Puteri Indonesia, after Angelina Sondakh in 2001. She crowned together with Puteri Indonesia Lingkungan; Felicia Hwang Yi Xin of Lampung, Puteri Indonesia Pariwisata; Intan Aletrinö of West Sumatra and Puteri Indonesia Perdamaian; Ariska Putri Pertiwi of North Sumatra.

Puteri Indonesia 2016 is one of the most successful pageants in Puteri Indonesia history, as it produced one title holder and every delegate placed at their respective pageants.

Results

Main
The Crowns of Puteri Indonesia Title Holders
 Puteri Indonesia 2016 (Miss Universe Indonesia 2016) 
 Puteri Indonesia Lingkungan 2016 (Miss International Indonesia 2016)
 Puteri Indonesia Pariwisata 2016 (Miss Supranational Indonesia 2016)
 Puteri Indonesia Perdamaian 2016 (Miss Grand Indonesia 2016)

Contestants
39 Contestants have been confirmed. The information from Puteri Indonesia Official website.

Post pageant notes
Kezia Warouw, Miss Universe Indonesia, finished Top 13 (10th placed) semi-finalists on the Miss Universe 2016 held on January 30, 2017 at Mall of Asia Arena in Pasay, Philippines.
Felicia Hwang, Miss International Indonesia, was 2nd Runner-Up at Miss International 2016 during the finals held on October 27 at the Tokyo Dome City Hall in Tokyo, Japan.
Intan Aletrino, Miss Supranational Indonesia, was hailed as one of the Top 10 (7th placed) finalists at Miss Supranational 2016 was held in Poland on December 2, 2016.
Ariska Putri, Miss Grand International Indonesia, was crowned Miss Grand International 2016 during the finals held on October 25 at the Westgate Las Vegas Resort & Casino in Las Vegas, USA.

References

External links 

 Official Puteri Indonesia Official Website
 Official Miss Universe Official Website
 Miss International Official Website
 Official Miss Supranational Official Website

2016
Puteri Indonesia